Awujale is the royal title of the king of the Ijebu Kingdom. The holder is addressed as the Awujale of Ijebuland. The present Awujale is Oba Sikiru Kayode Adetona Ogbagba II. He is from the House of Anikinaiya.

By the declaration made under section 4(2) of the Chiefs Law 1957 of the Customary Law regulating the selection of the Awujale of Ijebuland Chieftaincy, there are four ruling houses:

 House of Gbelegbuwa 
 House of Anikinaiya 
 House of Fusengbuwa 
 House of Fidipote

The Declaration was approved 25 August 1959 and registered on 1 September 1959.

List of past and present Awujales 
 OBA OLU-IWA
 OBA OSHIN
 OBANTA – 1430
 OBA GURU – 1445
 OBA MUNIGBUWA – 1455
 OBANTA II – 1460
 OBA LOJA – 1470
 OBA LOFIN – 1482
 OBA APASA – 1496
 OBA GANJU – 1508
 OBA TEWOGBOYE – 1516
 OBA RUWAMUDA – 1520
 OBA OFINRAN – 1532
 OBA LAPENGBUA – 1537
 OBA OTUTUBIOSUN – 1537
 OBA MOKO IDOWA AJUWAKALE – 1540
 OBA ADISA – 1552
 OBA JEWO – 1561
 OBA ELEWU ILEKE – 1576
 OBA OLUMISODAN ELEWU ILEKE – 1590
 OBA MASE – 1620
 OBA OLOTUSESO – 1625
 OBA MOLA – 1635
 OBA AJANA – 1642
 OBA ORE OR GADEGUN – 1644 (The first female Awujale)
 OBA GUNWAJA – 1655
 OBA JADIARA OR OLOWOJOYEMEJI – 1660
 OBA SAPOKUN – 1675
 OBA FALOKUN – 1687
 OBA MEKUN – 1692
 OBA GBODOGI – 1702
 OBA OJIGI AMOYEGESO – 1710
 OBA LIYEWE AROJOFAYE – 1730
 OBA MOYEGE OLOPE – 1730
 OBA OJORA – 1735
 OBA FESOJOYE – 1745
 OBA ORE JEJE – 1749 (Female)
 OBA SAPENNUWA RUBA KOYE – 1750
 OBA ORODUDU JOYE – 1755
 OBA TEWOGBUWA I – 1758
 OBA GBELEGBUWA I – 1760
 OBA FUSENGBUWA – 1790
 OBA SETEJOYE – 1820
 OBA ANIKILAYA FIGBAJOYE AGBOOGUNSA – 1821
 OBA AFIDIPOTEMOLE ADEMUYEWO – 1850
 OBA ATUNWASE ADESINBO – 1886
 OBA OGBAGBA AGBOTEWOLE I – 1895
 OBA FUSIGBOYE ADEONA – 1906
 OBA FESOGBADE ADEMOLU – 1916 (Dethroned)
 OBA ADEKOYA ELERUJA – 1916
 OBA ADEMOLU FESOGBADE – 1917 (Enthroned again)
 OBA ADENUGA AFOLAGBADE – 1925
 OBA OGUNNAIKE FIBIWOJA – 1929
 OBA DANIEL ADESANYA GBELEGBUWA II – 1933-1959
 OBA Dr. SIKIRU OLUWAKAYODE ADETONA, OGBAGBA AGBOTEWOLE II – 1960–present

References

Yoruba monarchs
Lists of African monarchs
Yoruba history